The 2009 Damallsvenskan was the 22nd season of the Damallsvenskan, the highest level of professional women's football in Sweden, with 12 teams competing. The season ran from 25 March to 7 November. For the first time in five years the league had a new champion in Linköpings, as Umeå IK did not manage to win the league for a fifth time in a row. Newly promoted Piteå and Stattena were both relegated. Göteborg's Linnea Liljegärd finished as the season's top scorer with 22 goals.

Table

References

Damallsvenskan seasons
2009 in association football
2009 in Swedish sport